Seven Sisters Oak, located in Mandeville, Louisiana, is a notably large southern live oak in Louisiana. The tree was originally registered at the Live Oak Society as "Doby’s Seven Sisters" (No. 200) because the Doby family owned the property where the tree was located and Mrs. Doby was one of seven sisters.  The tree was renamed "Seven Sisters Oak" and reregistered at the Live Oak Society as member number 697. Seven Sisters Oak is the current president of the Live Oak Society, a status awarded to it by being the largest live oak registered by the society. Although there was some controversy as to whether the oak was one tree or several trees that had grown together, an inspection by professional foresters in 1976 determined that the tree developed from a single root system.

In 2018, its limb spread exceeded . The age of Seven Sisters Oak has been estimated at between 500 and 1,000 years old.

See also
 List of individual trees

References

External links
Mighty Oaks Recover After Hurricane Katrina  

Individual oak trees
Geography of St. Tammany Parish, Louisiana
Tourist attractions in St. Tammany Parish, Louisiana
Individual trees in the United States
Oldest trees
Landmarks in Louisiana